Claes-Göran Cederlund (21 August 1948 - 15 November 2020) was a Swedish radiologist and birdwatcher. His record reached 9,761/ 9,770 (No.1 on Surfbirds, No.1 on iGoTerra).
During his birdwatching pursuits he visited over 135 countries.

He died on 15 November 2020 at the age of 72.

References

Swedish radiologists
Birdwatchers
1948 births
2020 deaths